Paush Purnima is celebrated during the Magha month of Hindu calendar. The specialty of this day is to take a dip in any holy water body. Some parts of India celebrate Paush Purnima as Shakambhari Purnima.

References

Hindu festivals
Religious festivals in India